The Bendigo School of Mines was established in Bendigo, Australia in 1873 to provide technical education, predominantly for the mining industry.

It was then known as the Bendigo School of Mines and Industries from 1883 to 1959, Bendigo Technical College from 1959 to 1967, and Bendigo Institute of Technology from 1967 to 1975. Its changes of name reflected the broadening scope of the technical education it delivered.

A history of the organisation was published in 1973 - "Canvas to campus: a history of the Bendigo Institute of Technology", written by Frank Cusack.

In 1975 it merged with the humanities focused State College of Victoria at Bendigo (previously the Bendigo Teachers' College) to form the generalist Bendigo College of Advanced Education (1975-1990), which became the La Trobe University College of Northern Victoria on 1 January 1991. This body maintained much academic independence from the greater La Trobe University organisation until the early 2000s.

It is now La Trobe University's Bendigo Campus.

Notable past students
 Richard "Dick" Hamilton c. 1875, general manager, Great Boulder Mines
 Samuel Prior, c. 1887, later editor and owner of The Bulletin.
 John Scaddan, c.1889-1895, later Premier of Western Australia
 Edward Heitmann c.1896, later Australian M.P.
 John Michael Higgins c.1882, metallurgist
 Agnes Goodsir, 1898–1899, portrait painter
 E. J. C. Wraith, one of Australia's earliest wireless telegraphy experimenters, 1901

References

 Bendigo School of Mines (1873– ) Australian Science at Work

External links
 Photograph of the school

Public schools in Victoria (Australia)
Educational institutions established in 1873
Education in Bendigo
History of mining in Australia
1873 establishments in Australia
Bendigo